Intimate Relations is a 1996 Canadian-British film, the first movie by writer and director Philip Goodhew. It stars Rupert Graves, Julie Walters and a fifteen-year-old Laura Sadler, the only feature film in her short career. The film is a drama and black comedy about a young man who has an affair with the middle-aged housewife he is lodging with. Matters are soon complicated when the housewife's teenage daughter gets involved after developing a crush on the young lodger.

The film takes place in the 1950s in the suburbs of London. The film depicts the hypocritically prudish residents of a seemingly respectable household who, behind closed doors, indulge in the sort of sordid goings on they would publicly sneer at.

Plot
Marjorie Beaslie (Julie Walters) is a housewife in her forties who takes in a lodger named Harold Guppey (Rupert Graves), who has just stumbled into town to look up his long-lost brother (Les Dennis). Although seemingly prudish (she no longer sleeps in the same bed as her husband, for "medical reasons"), Marjorie takes a liking to Harold despite him being a good twenty years her junior, and they begin to have a clandestine affair. Marjorie insists that Harold refer to her as "mum", giving more than a little oedipal slant to their lustful antics.

Marjorie's youngest daughter is fourteen-year-old Joyce (Laura Sadler), a precocious girl who alternates between trying to act grown up by putting on make up and smoking cigarettes, and acting childish by disturbing people with tales of medieval punishments and giggling at rude words.

Joyce is fascinated by Harold and with her teasing behaviour she cunningly turns him from being apathetic towards her to being intrigued. When Joyce catches Harold and Marjorie in bed together, she seemingly does not realise what they are up to and merely thinks they're having an innocent "bunk up". She talks her way into getting into the bed with them. Harold and Marjorie continue their intimate relations whilst Joyce pretends to be asleep, realising what is actually going on.

A few days later, Joyce blackmails Harold into taking her to a hotel for the night, where he turns the tables on her with every intent and purpose but actually diverts his attention by doing much the opposite as he seduces her before spurning her.

Marjorie's much-older husband, Stanley (Matthew Walker), is a one-legged World War I veteran who sleeps in a separate room and is oblivious to Harold's relationships with either Marjorie or Joyce, as is the rest of their suburban community.

Sick of being caught between a mother and daughter, who are too old and too young for him respectively, Harold tries to get out of the house and move away by joining the army and getting a new girlfriend. However, Marjorie manages to emotionally blackmail him into coming back. One day, Harold takes Marjorie and Joyce out for a picnic, although things are tense between the trio. Having sent her daughter Joyce away to play, Marjorie begins to ravish Harold, but Joyce returns and hits her mother with an axe. Harold panics and attempts to get Marjorie into the car to take her to hospital but, with blood streaming down her face, Marjorie manages to pick up a knife Harold drops and attacks him with it. Harold fights Marjorie off and stabs her to death. Joyce then tries to attack Harold and he stabs her to death too. Finally, Harold stabs himself in the stomach in an attempt to emphasise that his actions were out of self-defence.

It is said in a post-script that he, the real Albert Goozee, was sentenced to death for Joyce's murder.

Cast
 Julie Walters as Marjorie Beasley
 Rupert Graves as Harold Guppey
 Laura Sadler as Joyce Beasley
 Matthew Walker as Stanley Beasley
 Les Dennis as Maurice Guppey
 Amanda Holden as Pamela
 Michael Bertenshaw as Mr Pugh
 Elsie Kelly as Enid
 Nicholas Hoult as Bobby

Inspiration
The film is based on the true story of Albert Goozee, who was put on trial in 1956 in England. He was arrested after his 53-year-old landlady, Mrs. Lydia Leakey, and her 14-year-old daughter, Norma, were found murdered. Goozee was tried only for the murder of the teenaged girl (Joyce, in the movie), convicted and imprisoned for life. The movie follows Goozee's own version of events, portraying him as an increasingly desperate young man caught in a love triangle between a mother and daughter, although as the only survivor there is no way of verifying if his version of the events was entirely truthful.

Goozee was released from prison in 1971 but was imprisoned again in 1996, the year Intimate Relations came out, for unrelated sex offences.

References

External links

Archived interview at Rupert Graves' own site about the film

1996 films
1996 comedy-drama films
1990s black comedy films
British comedy-drama films
British black comedy films
Canadian comedy-drama films
English-language Canadian films
Films set in the 1950s
Fox Searchlight Pictures films
1990s English-language films
1990s Canadian films
1990s British films